The Communist Party of Canada fielded several candidates in the 1984 federal election, none of whom were elected.  Information about these candidates may be found on this page.

Ontario

Nancy (Nan) McDonald (Eglinton—Lawrence)

McDonald was a frequent candidate for public office, campaigning for the Communist Party and the federal, provincial and municipal levels.  She was a social worker in private life, and was the Central Women's organizer for the Communist Party in 1979.

In 1986, she was listed a representative of the organization Consumers Against Rising Prices.  During the same year, she criticized the mainstream Canadian press for not publishing the details of a peace initiative launched by Union of Soviet Socialist Republics leader Mikhail Gorbachev.

Please note:  The 1982 municipal totals are taken from the Globe and Mail, newspaper, 9 November 1982 (90 out of 91 polls reporting).

References